Elbow Lake is a census-designated place in Becker and Clearwater counties in Minnesota, United States. Its population was 95 at the 2010 census.

Geography
According to the United States Census Bureau, the CDP has a total area of 1.2 square miles (3.1 km), all land.

Demographics

As of the census of 2000, there were 104 people, 36 households, and 24 families residing in the CDP. The racial makeup of the CDP was 25.00% White, 72.12% Native American, and 2.88% from two or more races. Hispanic or Latino of any race were 1.92% of the population.

There were 36 households, out of which 41.7% had children under the age of 18 living with them, 47.2% were married couples living together, 19.4% had a female householder with no husband present, and 30.6% were non-families. 27.8% of all households were made up of individuals, and 13.9% had someone living alone who was 65 years of age or older. The average household size was 2.89 and the average family size was 3.44.

In the CDP, the population was spread out, with 35.6% under the age of 18, 7.7% from 18 to 24, 25.0% from 25 to 44, 23.1% from 45 to 64, and 8.7% who were 65 years of age or older. The median age was 35 years. For every 100 females, there were 82.5 males. For every 100 females age 18 and over, there were 97.1 males.

The median income for a household in the CDP was $17,708, and the median income for a family was $18,393. Males had a median income of $20,625 versus $16,042 for females. The per capita income for the CDP was $6,713. There were 27.0% of families and 24.2% of the population living below the poverty line, including 26.4% of under eighteens and none of those over 64.

See also

 List of census-designated places in Minnesota

References

External links

Census-designated places in Becker County, Minnesota
Census-designated places in Clearwater County, Minnesota
Census-designated places in Minnesota